The Christian People's Party (CVP) was a political party in Weimar Germany.

History
The party contested the 1920 federal elections in an alliance with the Bavarian People's Party known as the  Christian Federalist Imperial Election List. The CVP gained just 0.25% of the national vote, but won a single seat. They did not contest any further elections. A Catholic party, it was mainly based in the Rhineland area of western Germany.

References

Defunct political parties in Germany
Political parties with year of establishment missing
Political parties with year of disestablishment missing
Catholic political parties